Elderfield is a surname. Notable people with the surname include:

Christopher Elderfield (1607–1652), English clergyman and theologian
Henry Elderfield (1943–2016), British geologist
John Elderfield (born 1943), American art historian and curator
Matthew Elderfield (born 1966), British financial regulator
Robert Elderfield (1904–1979), American chemist